"You'll Be Mine" is a single by New York-based band The Pierces. It is the first single released from their fourth studio album You & I. It was released on March 6, 2011 as a Digital download and on 7 March 2011 on CD.

Music video 
The music video was uploaded to YouTube on January 28, 2011.

Track listing

Chart performance

Release history

References 

2011 singles
2011 songs
Polydor Records singles